Uranothauma frederikkae, the Cameroon branded blue, is a butterfly in the family Lycaenidae. It is found in Nigeria and Cameroon. The habitat consists of submontane forests at altitudes above 1,300 meters.

Subspecies
Uranothauma frederikkae frederikkae (Nigeria, Cameroon)
Uranothauma frederikkae manengoubensis Libert, 1993 (Cameroon)

References

Butterflies described in 1993
Uranothauma